ZGS may refer to:

 Zimbabwe Geological Survey
 ZGS Communications, a United States broadcasting company
 Chinese Sign Language, from name in Mandarin, Zhōngguó Shǒuyǔ.
 La Romaine Airport, with IATA code ZGS